Corymbia grandifolia, commonly known as the cabbage gum, large-leaved cabbage gum and the paper-fruited bloodwood, is a species of tree that is endemic to northern Australia. It has smooth bark, egg-shaped to broadly elliptic to lance-shaped adult leaves, flowers buds in groups of three or seven, creamy white flowers and cup-shaped to cylindrical fruit.

Description
It has smooth white to pale grey bark that is shed in thin flakes. The tree loses its leaves in the dry season. Flowering occurs from September to January and the flowers are creamy white.

Taxonomy and naming
Cabbage gum was first formally described in 1867 by George Bentham from an unpublished description by Robert Brown and was given the name Eucalyptus grandifolia. Bentham's description was published in Flora Australiensis. In 1995 Ken Hill and Lawrie Johnson changed the name to Corymbia grandifolia.

In the same paper, Hill and Johnson described three subspecies and the names have been accepted by the Australian Plant Census:
 Corymbia grandifolia (R.Br. ex Benth.) K.D.Hill & L.A.S.Johnson subsp. grandifolia; 
 Corymbia grandifolia subsp. lamprocardia L.A.S.Johnson; 
 Corymbia grandifolia subsp. longa L.A.S.Johnson.

Distribution and habitat
Corymbia grandifolia grows in open forest, in woodland near watercourses and swamps and rocky slopes or flats in skeletal sandy soils over sandstone or basalt. Its range extends from the Kimberley region of Western Australia, across the top end of the Northern Territory including Bathurst and Melville Islands, and along the coast of the Gulf of Carpentaria as far east as the Gilbert River in Queensland.

See also
 List of Corymbia species

References

grandifolia
Myrtales of Australia
Flora of Western Australia
Plants described in 1867